Derick Johannes Minnie (born 1986 in Alberton, South Africa) is a rugby union player for Italian Pro14 side Zebre. He plays as a flanker.

In 2013, he was named in the  touring squad for their 2013 Super Rugby season, but returned to the Lions for the 2014 Super Rugby season.

Zebre

He joined Italian Pro12 side Zebre for the 2016–17 Pro12 season.
Minnie played 783 minutes, scoring 15 points in the 2016 - 2017 season for Zebre, playing 14 games in the Pro12, starting 11 and coming on as substitute for 3, he received 1 yellow card.

References

External links

Lions Profile
itsrugby.co.uk Profile

1986 births
Living people
Afrikaner people
South African rugby union players
Rugby union flankers
People from Alberton, Gauteng
Golden Lions players
Lions (United Rugby Championship) players
Sharks (rugby union) players
Rugby union players from Gauteng